Matsu'o Tsurayaba is a fictional character associated with the Hand, and part of the Marvel Comics universe. A member of the Hand, Tsurayaba's first appearance came in Uncanny X-Men #255 and was directly involved with the "body swap incident" between Betsy Braddock and Kwannon just after Betsy's emergence from the Siege Perilous.

Fictional character biography
Matsu'o Tsurayaba was a Hand assassin working in Japan. His love, another assassin by the name of Kwannon, worked for an opposing crime boss named Nyorin. Though they knew their respective employers would eventually clash, the two remained lovers, and vowed to fight honorably to the death should they have to. Fatefully, they did. Matsu'o was ordered by the Hand to kill Nyorin, and during his fight with Kwannon, she slipped, and fell from the cliffs they were on to the ocean below. Matsu'o brought her broken body to the labs of the Hand. They were able to keep her body alive, but her mind was shattered beyond repair.

Soon after, the X-Man Psylocke emerged from the Siege Perilous. Betsy Braddock washed up, naked and amnesiac, on a beach of an island belonging to the Hand. Matsu'o recognized the woman as Psylocke and devised a plan to use her telepathic abilities to restore his lover's mind. His idea was to transplant the mind of Kwannon into the body of Psylocke. Kwannon possessed a natural empathic ability that would ensure her mind would survive contact with a high-level telepath's like Psylocke, but her body was still too weak for such a transfer. Matsu'o contacted the villain Spiral, who agreed to help.

Spiral, true to her penchant for deception and treachery, did more than just switch the two minds. She twisted the DNA of both women so that both bodies were genetically the same, each bearing characteristics of the other. She also spliced the minds of both women, planting pieces of each in both bodies. After the transfer was complete, both the Asian body of Kwannon and the European body of Psylocke possessed parts of the psyches of both women, though it was later revealed that more of Betsy's mind existed within Kwannon's body and more of Kwannon's resided within Psylocke's. The process also halved Psylocke's telepathy between them.

Seeing that both women seemed to be in both bodies, Matsu'o was more interested in the body that looked the most like his lost love, and left the other body, who would later become Revanche, in the hands of her old employer Nyorin.

Matsu'o aided Psylocke, now Asian, in her recovery, training her in various martial arts and making her into the Mandarin's finest assassin. A warrior is exactly what Elizabeth Braddock had always dreamed of becoming, and Matsu'o, along with Spiral and the Hand, unwittingly gave Betsy Braddock her innermost desire.

Matsu'o later allied with Fenris to revive Omega Red.

Later, when Revanche attacked Psylocke, claiming to be the true Elizabeth Braddock, the two women, accompanied by Beast and Gambit, went to Japan to discover the truth. Though they found planted evidence in the form of a false diary written by Lord Nyoirin, Matsu'o refused to reveal the truth. Revanche, having nowhere else to go, decided to remain with the X-Men and aided them on several missions.

Later still, Revanche contracted the Legacy Virus. Her telepathic powers slowly increased to the point that she could cut through the confusion in her own mind and remember who she truly was: the real Kwannon, as Psylocke was the real Betsy Braddock. Near death, she confronted Matsu'o, who finally admitted the truth and begged for forgiveness. Sensing her imminent death, she asked Matsu'o (affectionately called Matta) to kill her before she burned herself out. He did, plunging a blade into her heart, and buried her. With Kwannon's death, Psylocke's full telepathic potential was returned to her. Sensing Revanche's death, Psylocke went to find Matsu'o, who explained everything. Revanche also left a portion of her psionic energies within Matsu'o, who used it at her behest, removing Kwannon's fractured memories and personality traits from Betsy Braddock's mind, and restoring those of Betsy's that were possessed by Kwannon. Matsu'o wished to commit suicide to join his lover, but was stopped by Psylocke, who convinced him to honor her memory by becoming the man she would have wanted.

Matsu'o's resolve to become a better person would not last, however. His enmity with Wolverine led him to initiate an attack on his lover, Mariko Yashida. In particular, Matsu'o collaborated with another of Logan's love interests, Silver Fox, the leader of HYDRA. After distracting Wolverine they sent an assassin to poison Mariko. The assassination was a success, but Matsu'o underestimated Wolverine's true berserker rage. In a mad fit of revenge, Logan entered Tsurayaba's penthouse, and sliced off his arm. Logan then promised him that every year on Mariko's death, he would carve a little more off the Hand boss. Matsu'o is now missing his arm, right ear, nose, and gall bladder.  At one point Wolverine finally killed a now partly cyborg Matsu'o only for him to be almost instantly brought back to life by his own Hand ninjas (much to Matsu'o's chagrin as he wanted to die rather than face the constant waiting for Wolverine).

Psylocke, having returned from her stint with the Exiles, travelled to Japan to bury her former body. Upon arriving she was ambushed by the Hand, who destroyed her body with an incendiary device, stating as they departed that Matsu'o gave the command to attack. Enraged, Psylocke tracks Matsu'o down, only to be horrified to find him terribly disfigured; the result of Wolverine's yearly revenge. Matsu'o, now missing both hands and other body parts, desires an honorable death and wants Psylocke to grant him that honor since he cannot hold a blade to perform seppuku. Before Psylocke can oblige, Wolverine emerges from the shadows and says that Matsu'o's punishment is not over yet. The two X-Men engage in a brutal fight that ends in a standstill. Wolverine finally relents, however, allowing Psylocke to kill Matsu'o. She generates a telepathic illusion of Kwannon in Matsu'o's mind, then kills him quickly with her psychic blade.

Powers and abilities
Matsu'o Tsurayaba is trained in various martial arts disciplines. He once wore a prosthetic right hand with retractable finger blades.

Matsu'o Tsurayaba's strength has been augmented with cybernetic implants. On occasion, he has worn an armored battlesuit of unrevealed capabilities.

References

External links
 Matsu'o Tsurayaba at Marvel.com
 UncannyXmen.net Character Profile on Matsu'o Tsurayaba
 

Comics characters introduced in 1989
Characters created by Chris Claremont
Marvel Comics martial artists
Marvel Comics supervillains
Fictional Japanese people
Wolverine (comics) characters